This is a list of members of the Tasmanian House of Assembly, elected at the 1986 state election:

 Labor member Darrel Baldock resigned on 30 June 1987 to take up a role as coach of St Kilda Football Club. Chris Batt was elected as his replacement on 14 July.
 Liberal member Geoff Davis resigned from the Liberal Party on 8 July 1987, and from parliament on 17 September. John Barker was appointed as his replacement on 29 September.
 Liberal member and Deputy Premier Geoff Pearsall resigned in late October 1988. John Cleary was appointed as his replacement on 14 November.

Members of Tasmanian parliaments by term
20th-century Australian politicians